Gavrikov is a Russian masculine surname, its feminine counterpart is Gavrikova. It may refer to
Dmitri Gavrikov (born 1994), Russian football player 
Viktor Gavrikov (1957-2016), Lithuanian-Swiss chess grandmaster
Vladislav Gavrikov (born 1995), Russian ice hockey defenceman

Russian-language surnames